Aristarchian symbols are editorial marks developed during the Hellenistic period and the early Roman empire for annotating then-ancient Greek texts—mainly the works of Homer. They were used to highlight missing text, text which was discrepant between sources, and text which appeared in the wrong place.

Two main types of ancient Greek philological annotations can be distinguished: signs and explicit notes. Aristarchian symbols are signs.

Early development
For this reason, the practice of using signs for textual criticism has been called 'obelism'.

Aristophanes of Byzantium invented later the 'asterisk'  to mark lines that are duplicated from another place, as well as the 'lunate sigma'  and the 'antisigma'  for two consecutive and interchangeable lines of the same content.

A system of dots also credited to Aristophanes of Byzantium was developed in the 3rd century BCE. Other writers employed two dot punctuation  to mark the ends of sentences or changing speakers. Less often, arrangements of three , four  , and five  dots appeared.

System of Aristarchus
The number of the philological signs and in some cases their meanings were modified by Aristarchos of Samothrake (220–143 BCE), sixth head of the Alexandrinian Library. He used critical and exegetical signs in his editions of the Homeric poems.

A 'dotted lunate sigma'  was used by him as an editorial sign indicating that the line so-marked is at an incorrect position in the surrounding text; an antisigma, or 'reversed lunate sigma' , may also mark an out of place line. A 'dotted antisigma' or 'dotted reversed sigma'  indicates the line after which rearrangements should be made, or to variant readings of uncertain priority.

The diple  marked lines whose language or content was perhaps also exegetically noteworthy and pointed to a corresponding explanation in a commentary. The   a dotted diple pointed to a verse in which Aristarchos' edition differs from that of Zenodotos. He used the obelos added to the asteriskos  where the repeated line is out of place and the   indicated suspected spuriousness.

Continued use in late classical texts
Aristarchos's  were adopted early on by scholars in Rome, and became the standard philological signs for centuries to follow. Some papyrus fragments contain un-Aristarchian signs whose use was fairly consistent nevertheless.

In addition to no punctuation, many original source texts in ancient Greek were written as an unbroken stream of letters, with no separation between words. The , a curved, comma-like mark , was used to disambiguate certain homonyms and marked the word-break in a sequence of letters that should be understood as two separate words. The  (see picture, right) marked a division in a text. The   was used to mark the ends of entire works, or the end of major sections in poetic and prose texts.

Modern typesetting
Nine ancient Greek textual annotation symbols are included in the supplemental punctuation list of ISO IEC standard 10646 for character sets. Unicode encodes several more signs.

Cultural references
The names of the characters Asterix and Obelix in the French comic series The Adventures of Asterix by René Goscinny and Albert Uderzo are derived from the Aristarchian symbols.

See also
 Dagger (typography)
 Comma
 Textual criticism
 Annotation
 Marginalia
 Proofreading marks

References

Typographical symbols
Punctuation
Ancient Greek punctuation
Writing systems introduced in the 2nd century BC